Oswald Feliz (born October 29, 1990) is an American politician and attorney serving as a member of the New York City Council from the 15th district. He assumed office on April 15, 2021.

Early life and education 
Feliz is a native of The Bronx. After graduating from Walton High School, he earned a Bachelor of Arts degree in political science and philosophy from Lehman College and a Juris Doctor from the CUNY School of Law.

Career 
Feliz worked on the staff of State Senator Gustavo Rivera. Since graduating from law school, Feliz has worked as a tenant lawyer, defending vulnerable tenants at risk of eviction. He is also an adjunct professor at Hostos Community College. In 2016, Feliz worked on Adriano Espaillat's historic congressional campaign. Feliz was elected to the New York City Council in an April 2021 special election to succeed Ritchie Torres, who was elected to the United States House of Representatives.

References 

American politicians of Dominican Republic descent
Living people
New York (state) Democrats
New York City Council members
Hispanic and Latino American New York City Council members
Politicians from the Bronx
New York (state) lawyers
Lehman College alumni
CUNY School of Law alumni
Hostos Community College faculty
21st-century American politicians
1990 births